The Bark scale is a psychoacoustical scale proposed by Eberhard Zwicker in 1961. It is named after Heinrich Barkhausen who proposed the first subjective measurements of loudness. One definition of the term is "...a frequency scale on which equal distances correspond with perceptually equal distances. Above about 500 Hz this scale is more or less equal to a logarithmic frequency axis. Below 500 Hz the Bark scale becomes more and more linear."

The scale ranges from 1 to 24 and corresponds to the first 24 critical bands of hearing.

It is related to, but somewhat less popular than, the mel scale, a perceptual scale of pitches judged by listeners to be equal in distance from one another.

Bark scale critical bands 

Since the direct measurements of the critical bands are subject to error, the values in this table have been generously rounded.

In his letter "Subdivision of the Audible Frequency Range into Critical Bands", Zwicker states:
"These bands have been directly measured in experiments on the threshold for complex sounds, on masking, on the perception of phase, and most often on the loudness of complex sounds. In all these phenomena, the critical band seems to play an important role. It must be pointed out that the measurements taken so far indicate that the critical bands have a certain width, but that their position on the frequency scale is not fixed; rather, the position can be changed continuously, perhaps by the ear itself."
Thus the important attribute of the Bark scale is the width of the critical band at any given frequency, not the exact values of the edges or centers of any band.

Conversions 
To convert a frequency f (Hz) into Bark use:

or (Traunmüller, 1990) 

or (Wang, Sekey & Gersho, 1992)

See also 
 Luminosity function, which describes the average sensitivity of the human eye to light of different wavelengths.
 Fletcher–Munson curves
 Equivalent rectangular bandwidth, the ERB scale
 Critical bands

References

External links

Smith and Abel – Bark and ERB Bilinear Transforms (1999)
Auditory scales of frequency representation

Scales
Psychoacoustics
1961 in science
1961 in Germany